WYCA (102.3 FM) is licensed to Crete, Illinois, south of Chicago, with studios in Hammond, Indiana, and transmitter in Beecher, Illinois, south of Crete. The station is owned by Dontron, Inc., a subsidiary of Crawford Broadcasting Co.

WYCA is formatted as a religious station, primarily urban contemporary gospel. The most popular program of the broadcast day is the "King's Highway" morning show, featuring Gospel Announcer Darryll King.  Ms. King has won numerous awards for her work in black gospel radio.  The remaining broadcast day is divided between black gospel music and various recorded and live broadcasts by local and national gospel ministers.  Some program length commercial broadcasts are also aired.

WYCA broadcasts one channel in the HD Radio format.

History
The station began broadcasting on October 1, 1964, as WTAS, and was originally owned by Anthony Santuccis's South Cook Broadcasting Inc. WTAS had long aired a full service format, airing a variety of local programming and playing Middle of the road (MOR) music, which included pop standards and soft AC. Much of the station's local news, talk and community programming was simulcast with its sister station 1600 WCGO in Chicago Heights, Illinois, until 1992. In 1985, the station began airing the Warren Freiberg - Libby Collins Show, which had been heard on 106.3 WLNR in Lansing, Illinois since 1973.

Early Gospel years
In 1992, WTAS began airing a Black gospel format, simulcasting the programming of 1510 WWHN in Joliet, Illinois. In 1993, the station was purchased by Word of Faith Fellowship, Inc. for $800,000, and on October 22, 1993, its callsign was changed to WEMG-FM, with the station continuing to air a black gospel format. In 1997, the station was sold to Dontron, Inc. for $1.8 million. In summer 1997, the station was taken silent. On October 31, 1997, the station's callsign was changed to WYAA. The station returned to the air January 5, 1998. As WYAA, the station played gospel oldies, love songs, and Christian jazz, along with brokered religious programming.

Hot 102 & The Groove
On June 1, 2000, the station's callsign was changed to WVJM, and the station adopted an urban contemporary format as "Hot 102". As an urban contemporary station, WVJM "Hot 102" carried the syndicated Doug Banks show. On March 26, 2001, the station's urban contemporary format was moved to longtime gospel station WYCA 92.3 in Hammond, Indiana along with the call letters WVJM. The call letters WYCA briefly moved to 102.3, before being moved to WYBA 106.3  in Lansing, Illinois on April 22, 2001, with 102.3 adopting WYBA as its callsign. As WYBA, the station initially aired an R&B format as "The Groove".

Rejoice 102
The station switched to its current Gospel music format as "Rejoice 102" on February 17, 2003. On September 30, 2003, the station's callsign was changed to WYCA, as 106.3 in Lansing changed its callsign to WSRB and dropped its Gospel format in favor of an Urban AC format. With the end of the Gospel format on 106.3, Gospel Announcer Darryll King moved her weekday program from 106.3 to 102.3, though she continues to host a show on 106.3 WSRB on Sundays. WYCA is now the lone religious outlet for Crawford in the Chicago area.

References

External links

Will County, Illinois
YCA
Gospel radio stations in the United States
YCA
Radio stations established in 1964
1964 establishments in Illinois